Collegeland is a townland in Athlone, County Westmeath, Ireland. The townland is in the civil parish of St. Mary's.

The townland stands to the east of the city centre, and contains the Auburn Heights estate.

References 

Townlands of County Westmeath